Ali Reza Eftekhari (born March 30, 1958) is an Iranian vocalist of Iranian classical and popular music. He is one of the most popular singers in Iran and his works are among the best-selling works of Iranian music. This singer has released more than seventy music albums so far.  He is known as the man of a thousand faces of Iranian music.

He is one of the few artists that have gained the respect and admiration of classical music lovers everywhere. It is refreshing to see younger artists continue to present beautiful classical Iranian music to the younger generation.

Career 
Alireza Eftekhari was born in 1958 in Isfahan.  As a child, he studied with Tabatabai, a violinist.  From the age of 12, he studied vocal lines with Taj Esfahani.  After a while, he started to use the teachings of Jalil Shahnaz and Hassan Kasaei in the field of traditional music.  In 1978, Ali Tajvidi won the first place in the Barbad exam and in the presence of Ali Akbar Shahnazi, Dariush Safvat, and Ali Tajvidi.  He has been studying music with Gholamreza Dadbeh since 1981.  In 1983, he released his first album on the advice of Faramarz Payvar called "Atash Del" and in memory of Taj Esfahani.  After three years, Eftekhari performed works such as Raz va Niaz in collaboration with Hossein Alizadeh and Mehrvarzan in collaboration with Mohammad Ali Kiani-Nejad.  In the early years of the 1981s, Eftekhari also had private performances with Hassan Kasaei, Habibollah Badiei, Gholam Hossein Bigjehkhani, and Jalil Shahnaz, all of which were single-copy and never published.

Biography
Eftekhari learned music from several well-known Iranian musicians, including Taj Isfahani and Ali Tajvidi.  Ali Reza Eftekhari is one of the most prolific Iranian vocalists. Eftekhari is a popular and prolific Persian singer. He put significant effort into changing the situation of popular music in Iran.  In his own words: "In order to introduce pop music to Iranian music culture, I have made myself a scapegoat."

Discography

Album 
 Atashe Del (1983) with Faramarz Paivar
 Mehrvarzan (1985)
 Hamtaye Aftab (1986) with Emad Raam
 Raz o Niaz (1988) with Hossein Alizadeh
 Darigha (1990)
 Karevan (1991)
 Gharibestan (1991)
 
 Raz e Gol (1993) with Mojtaba Mirzadeh
 Sarve Simin (1995)
 Naze Negah (1995)
 Sarmastan (1995)
 Maqame Sabr (1994) with Parvize Meskatian
 Mehman e To (1995) with Jamshid Andalibi
 Niloufarane (1996) with Abbas Khoshdel
 Zibatarin (1996)
 Aman Az Jodaei (1997)
 Afsaneh (1998)
 Tazeh Be Tazeh (1998)
 Hengameh (1998)
 
 Niloufarane 2 (1999) with Abbas Khoshdel
 Yade Ostad (1998) with Ali Tajvidi
 Sedayam Kon (1999)
 Atre Soosan (1999)
 Paiez (1999)
 Khodahafez (1999)
 Shaban Ashegh (2000)
 Mastaneh (2000) with Jalal zolfnun
 Gole Hezar Bahar (2000)
 Gole Mikhak (2000)
Nasima (2001) with Fazlollah Tavakol
Shokohe Eshgh (2002)
Babatahir (2003)
Ghame Zamane (2004)
 Sayad (2005) with Mohammadreza CheraghAli
 To Miayi (2006) with Hassan MirzaKhani
 Ghalandarvar (2007) with Emad Tohidi
 Navaye Asatid (2008) with Jahanbakhsh Pazooki
 Ashegha Salam ..... (2008)
 Gereftar (2010)
 Shab KocheHa (2010)
 Jame Mosaffa (2012)
Khaneh Doost Kojast (2013) with sohrab sepehri poems
 Padeshahe Faslha (2014) with Hossein Parnia

Single Track 

 Maryam Mirzakhani (2017)
 Better Days (2017)
 Liberation (2015)

film musics 

 Amirkabir (TV Mini-Series) (singer) - 1985
 Shabhaye Zayendeh-Rood (singer) - 1990
 An Umbrella for Director (vocal) - 2002
 The Fifth Sun (TV series) (singer) - 2010-2011

Significant concerts 

 music performance by the Iran's National Orchestra. Lead singer Alireza Eftekhari accompanied the group  on the fourth night of the 32nd Fajr International Music Festival at Tehran’s Vahdat Hall on January 16. Fereidun Shahbazian led  the group.

 music performance by the Iran's National Orchestra. Lead singer Alireza Eftekhari accompanied the group in the Vahdat Hall and  Nader Mortezapour led. The Concert was dubbed Story of Loyalty.

See also 
 Music of Iran
Iran's National Orchestra
List of Iranian musicians
 Persian pop music

Notes

External links 
 Stream Eftekhari's music live (dead link)
 Iran Taraneh (Listen to Eftekhari's songs) (dead link)
 Discography (dead link)

1956 births
Living people
Iranian pop singers
20th-century Iranian male singers
Musicians from Isfahan
Iranian Science and Culture Hall of Fame recipients in Music
21st-century Iranian male singers